Quyen is the Anglicised spelling of a Vietnamese surname (Quyền) as well as various Vietnamese given names (Quyên, Quyễn, Quyền).

Surname
The Vietnamese surname Quyền, meaning "power" or "right", is cognate with the Chinese surname now spelled Quán in Mandarin Pinyin. People with this surname include:
Quyền Văn Minh (born 1954), Vietnamese jazz saxophonist

Given names
Quyen:
Quyen T. Nguyen, American surgeon
Quyen Tran, American cinematographer

Quyên:
Hoàng Quyên (born 1992), Vietnamese singer

Quyễn:
Nguyễn Quyễn (born 1952), Vietnamese long-distance runner

Quyền:
Ngô Quyền (897–944), Ngô dynasty king
Nguyễn Quyền (1869–1941), Vietnamese anti-colonial activist

References

Vietnamese-language surnames